Gumi-dong (구미동, 九美洞) is one of the 19 dongs of Bundang-gu, in the city of Seongnam, Gyeonggi Province. It has total area of 4.77km² (3.4% of Seongnam). As of April 30, 2006, there are 38,022 residents in Gumi-dong. 

Gumi-dong is located at the southernmost part of Bundang, bordering Yongin, Geumgok-dong and Jeongja-dong. 

Seoul National University Bundang Hospital is located in Gumi-dong near Bulgok Mountain. Also, Nonghyup Hanaro Mart, CGV Multiplex are in this area.

History
The southern part of Gumi-dong was called Gumi-ri, Sujin-myeon, Yongin in Joseon Dynasty. In 1914, the Japanese included some part of surrounding areas in Gumi-ri. In 1989, it was a part of Jungwon-gu and in 1991 it became one of the "dong"s of Bundang when Bundang became one of the "gu"s of Seongnam.

External links
 Gumi-dong Office

Bundang
Neighbourhoods in South Korea